The Amazons of DC Comics are a race of warrior women who exist as part of Greek mythology. They live on Paradise Island, later known as Themyscira, an isolated location in the middle of the ocean where they are hidden from Man's World (the rest of the world).

Depending on the origin story, they are the creation  of Aphrodite or were created from clay by a coterie of Olympian gods over three thousand years ago to serve as their messengers to the world in the name of peace and justice. For centuries, the women thrived in safety and security apart from a hostile, male-dominated world. As long as Amazons remain on Themyscira they do not age. Circumstances involving the unexpected arrival of Steve Trevor forced their existence to be revealed to the modern world.

There have been numerous incarnations of these Amazons after Marston's original depictions: Robert Kanigher's revised depiction (highlighted by the change of Queen Hippolyta's hair from brunette to blonde), George Pérez's reworking following the Crisis, and changes subsequent to Infinite Crisis and The New 52. What these groups have in common is that they are the people from which came DC Comics' superheroine Wonder Woman.

Fictional history

The Amazons of Paradise Island were first created by William Moulton Marston as allegories of his love leaders and as part of the origin story of his creation, Wonder Woman, who is also an allegory for the ideal love leader. These Amazons were a race of immortal super-women that lived on the magical Paradise Island. Granted life by Aphrodite, the Goddess of Love, the Amazons thrived in peace for centuries, but remained aloof from the world of Man. The youngest, strongest, and most human of the Amazons, Princess Diana, left her protective nation of sisterhood, renouncing her immortality to fight the forces of evil in Man's World as Wonder Woman.

Marston depicted the origin story of the Amazons as women sculpted and brought to life by Aphrodite, who had been tricked and captured by Hercules and his men. Aphrodite, angry that they had been tricked, left them imprisoned but finally relented and helped them escape. They then moved to their own women-only island, where, in the absence of male aggression, they developed a superior, war-free culture. The unbound cuffs ("Bracelets of Submission") were still worn to remind them that to give up their independence and/or to allow any man power over them will sapped them of their own power. Marston used bondage as a symbol concept. As a psychologist, Marston was heavily influenced by his polyamorous relationship with two women, one being the niece of Margaret Sanger, a renowned outspoken feminist.

Pre-Crisis
In the days of Ancient Greece, many centuries ago, the Amazons were the foremost nation in the world. In Amazonia, women ruled and all was well. Then one day, Hercules, the strongest man in the world, stung by the taunts that he could not conquer the Amazon women, selected his strongest and fiercest warriors and landed on the Amazons' shores.

The Amazons' queen, Hippolyte, met Hercules in personal combat, because she knew that with her magic girdle, given to her by Aphrodite, Goddess of Love, she could not lose.

Hippolyte defeated Hercules, but Hercules, with deceit and trickery, managed to secure Hippolyte's magic girdle—and soon the Amazons were taken into slavery. Aphrodite, angry at Hippolyte for having succumbed to the wiles of men, would do nothing to help them.

Finally, the Amazons were no longer able to bear their submission to men, and Hippolyte appealed to the Goddess Aphrodite again. This time not in vain, for she relented, and with her help, Hippolyte secured the magic girdle from Hercules.

With the magic girdle in Hippolyte's possession, it did not take long for the Amazons to overcome their masters—and taking from them their entire fleet, they set sail for another shore, for it was Aphrodite's condition that they leave the world of man and establish a new world of their own. Aphrodite also decreed that they must always wear the heavy bracelets fashioned by their captors, as a reminder that they must always keep aloof from men.

Paradise Island

And so, after sailing the seas many days and many nights, the Amazons found Paradise Island and settled there to build a new world. With its fertile volcanic soil, its marvelous flora and fauna, and varied natural resources, there was no want, no illness, no hatreds, no wars. And the Amazons would remain eternally youthful, as long as they remained on Paradise Island where they have access to their Fountain of Eternal Youth and Hippolyte retained the magic girdle, and as long as they did not permit themselves to again be beguiled by men to avoid submitting to them.

The Magic Sphere
Just after the Amazons conquered the Herculeans and set sail for their island, they were given the Magic Sphere by Athena, Goddess of War. Through this device, Hippolyte was able to view events in Man's World from the present and past—and sometimes even forecast the future. With the visions of the future seen from the Magic Sphere, the Amazons were able to far surpass the inventions of man-made civilization. Not only were the Amazons stronger and wiser, but their weapons were more advanced, and their flying machines were faster.

Post-Crisis
In the mid-1980s a storyline took place called Crisis on Infinite Earths in which all comics in the DC Universe ceased to exist and restarted with all new origins. When this happened it was explained that the Amazons were created by the goddess Artemis from the souls of women who had died at the hands of men, and were given new and stronger bodies, made from clay transformed into flesh and blood. These Amazons, like the Pre-Crisis versions, escaped Heracles (the Greek name for Hercules) and his men to an isolated and magically protected island, this one called Themyscira after the lost capital city of the Amazons' former homeland. In this new land, they were granted superhuman strength, speed, durability, agility, superhuman senses, enhanced intellect, immortality, and beauty. Some Amazons chose to remain behind, however, and, lacking immortality, formed the hidden nation of Bana-Mighdall. Stories featuring the Amazons appeared in Bonus Book inserts in Wonder Woman (vol. 2) #18 (July 1988) and #26 (January 1989).

Infinite Crisis
Due to the perceived failure of Wonder Woman's mission in Man's World, Themyscira and the Amazons are removed from the earth realm by the Athenian Gods.

Amazons Attack
The returned Amazons, led by a resurrected Hippolyta, invade Washington D.C.
In the end they are stripped of their memories and scattered throughout the earth
in mortal identities.

Flashpoint
In the reality-changing Flashpoint event, the Amazons are at war with the Atlanteans in Western Europe, after Hippolyta was killed by an Amazon disguised as an Atlantean during a wedding between Diana and Aquaman, causing Diana to become the Queen. They have taken over Britain, killing 12 million in the process. Many female superbeings are shown to be in league with them. It is later revealed the Ocean Master and Diana's aunt were behind this incident.

The New 52
In September 2011, The New 52 effectively rebooted DC's continuity. In this timeline, the history of the Amazons was likewise revised. Here they once again lived on Paradise Island as a race of supernaturally strong women with no use for men save for periodic mating escapades. Three times each century, the Amazons—completely naked—would raid ships in their waters and copulate with the crew. Upon conception, the men were killed to protect the Island's secrecy. Nine months later, all girls were celebrated while the boys were taken from their mothers. Feeling sympathy for these discarded progeny—as well as recognizing their potential as a workforce—the smith god Hephaestus exchanged weapons to the Amazons in return for the lives of the Amazonian boys. Sparing them from being cruelly drowned, he raised them as his own sons.

In this continuity, the Queen Hippolyta is depicted as having blond hair and is the biological mother of Diana. She conceived her daughter after an after-battle liaison with Zeus, master of the gods of Olympus. She invented the "molded from clay" story to protect Diana from Hera.

DC Rebirth
With DC Rebirth, writers went back to the Post-Crisis origins for the Amazons, largely due to the controversial depiction of their mating cycle. It is once again stated that the Amazons are immortal, and that they were conceived from the souls of women who had died at the hands of men.

Society
The fiercest and wisest among the Amazons holds the prestigious title "Wonder Woman – the definition of a Heroic Champion and Ambassador-at-Large. Queen Hippolyta was the previous "Wonder Woman" when she freed her people from slavery and led them to "paradise". Princess Diana is the most recent and youngest Amazon to hold the title.

Culture
As shown in the comic, the Amazons hold several customs and observances. Some include:

Courting ritual
When an Amazon wishes to court another, she presents an offering of a coconut. Inside the coconut is a nectarine seed strung onto a necklace and a bracelet made of thorns. The nectarine seed signifies a bounty, hoped for but not yet achieved. The thorn bracelet is partially wrapped in blue, red and gold ribbons. The blue represents hope, the red represents danger, and the gold represents a request to the goddess Athena to provide her blessing. The pursuer then takes out the necklace and says "That thou art full of promise", blesses it with a kiss, and places the necklace around her intended lover's neck. She then takes out the bracelet and says "That thou shall know the heart of another" and places the bracelet on her intended lover's wrist. If the person gifted chooses to accept the courtship, she then agrees to always wear the necklace and bracelet and never remove them until it can be mutually agreed upon to form a lasting relationship together. Until the two Amazons agree to finalize their relationship, the couple puts each other through a series of physical, mental and emotional tests to see if the intended relationship can withstand life's trials.

Marriage
In 2015, Sensation Comics featured Wonder Woman officiating a same-sex wedding (Issue #48) drawn by Australian illustrator Jason Badower. Inspired by the June Supreme Court ruling that established marriage equality in all 50 United States, Badower says DC Comics was "fantastic" about his idea for the issue. The Amazon people are not to be labelled sexually; Wonder Woman stated "...my country is all women. To us, it’s not ‘gay’ marriage. It's just marriage"; being a society that was only populated by women, "lesbian" in [the world's] eyes may have been "straight" for them. “No Amazon is going to look at another Amazon and say they are "Amazoning wrong". Because that wouldn't be paradise. The society accepts everyone in it. The requirement is, you're here and you're female [...] Nobody says a dress is inappropriate. Nobody says, ‘Why are you wearing pants?’ Nobody says you're too heavy. Nobody says you're too skinny, or not strong enough.”

Feast of the Five
One of the most revered observances the Themyscirian Amazons hold dear is called The Feast of the Five. On this day the Amazons pay homage to the five original goddesses who took part in their creation. Aside from constant prayer and worship, the occasion begins with a hunt in honour to the goddess Artemis. A harvest is also celebrated in honor of the goddess Demeter. A feast is then held in honor of the remaining goddesses. This is said to be the Themyscirians' most holy holiday. The Feast of the Five can be seen almost as a holy birthday for each of the Themyscirian Amazons, with the glory of the occasion being placed in honor to their creators.

Hiketeia
The Amazons observe an ancient Greek custom called Hiketeia, in which one person supplicates themselves to another in exchange for sustenance and protection. The supplication does not have to be accepted once offered, but when it is accepted both parties agree to take the contract very seriously. Should either the guardian or supplicant ever falter in their duties, the Erinyes, ancient and savage judgement bringers, will slaughter them instantly. When Hiketeia is offered, the supplicant says the following words to their intended guardian: "(Name of potential guardian), I am (name of potential servant). I offer myself in supplication to you. I come without protection. I come without means, without honor, without hope, with nothing but myself to beg for your protection. In your shadow I will serve, by your breath will I breathe, by your words will I speak, by your mercy will I live. With all my heart, with everything I can offer, I beg you, in Zeus' name, who watches over all supplicants, accept my plea."

Send Forth
When a female child is lost at sea, the child is rescued from drowning by the goddess Thetis. Thetis would rescue mortal female children she deemed "special" and safely transport them to the shores of Themyscira's Island of Healing (Male children were taken someplace else). Once on the island the Amazons' chief physician Epione would discover them and tend to their care. After this the child would be taken to the royal palace where one Amazon is selected as the child's "Guardian of Inspiration". The baby is then granted great wisdom and strength of spirit via a magical kiss. According to the Amazon Pythia, Julia Kapatelis was the last of hundreds of babies to experience this in 1937. This "blessing" in actuality is a subliminal suggestion for the child to teach peace and equality throughout their lives. This blessing can extend to descendants as well. This custom is called "Send Forth". Once this is done the child is considered an Amazon and spiritual daughter to the Amazon who blessed them. After a few days of recuperation and blessings, the child is taken to the island shores again, where she is taken back into the ocean and returned, again by Thetis who magically travels back in time to return the child to the exact point in time when the child first left her homeland.

Union with the Earth
All Themyscirian Amazons possesses the ability to relieve their bodies of physical injury and toxins by becoming one with the Earth's soil and then reforming their bodies whole again. The first time Diana does this she prays to her god Gaea saying: "Gaea, I pray to you. Grant me your strength. You are the Earth who suckled me, who nurtured and bred me. Through you all life is renewed. The circle which never ends. I pray you, mother Gaea, take me into your bosom. Please, let me be worthy." This is a very sacred ritual to the Themyscirians, only to be used in the most dire of circumstances.

The Victor's Circle
Created by Antiope in 1041 BCE, the Victor's Circle is a secret, quasi-official fighting organization where Amazons compete in unarmed combat (implied to be a form of pankration), either as a way to resolve disputes or simply to "[blow] off some extra steam." Fights are conducted in a cavern hidden behind a waterfall, within a small circular arena with semicircular seating both hewn out of the rock. Within the ring, all ranks and titles are considered irrelevant, and combatants fight as equals. At any given session, an Amazon may fight multiple times, such as a winner of a bout issuing a challenge to or being challenged by an audience member. A number of notable Amazons hold records in the Victor's Circle, such as Diana holding the record for most submissions, Nubia holding the record for most knockouts, and Philippus the record for most fights.

Death
Originally a cavern was built under the Amazons' Temple of the Dead, which is where those dead are remembered. After an Amazon's funeral is completed, the body is lowered into the cavern where it is laid to rest in a city of the dead. Queen Hippolyta assigns the chief temple priestess to remain alone in the city to watch over the dead for a thousand years before a replacement is made.

This tradition was later changed as the Amazons discovered that the priestess often went mad in her solitude. One such priestess brought the dead to life through the use of magic during a mad outburst. The Amazons soon after burned their dead, during which the souls of the slain Amazons took form among the flames before traveling onto the plane of afterlife called the Elysian Fields.

Inherent abilities

All Themyscirian Amazons are themselves wonder women and possess various degrees of incredible superhuman strength, speed, stamina and extraordinarily acute senses and the ability to glide on aircurrents, as seen in the second competition for the title of Wonder Woman won by Orana. All these were gifts blessed to them by their gods. As shown by various tribe members, they have the capability to break apart steel and concrete with their bare hands, jump over 1,200 feet from a standing position, have a high durability factor, enhanced healing, and the ability to absorb and process a vast amount of knowledge in a short period of time. Themyscirian Amazons also possess immortality that allows them to live indefinitely in a youthful form, but does leave them open to potential injury and death depending on their actions. They also have developed high levels of hand-to-hand combat training, mastered over 3,000 years, and are experts in the use of various hand held weapons.

Themyscirian Amazons also possess the ability to relieve their bodies of physical injury and toxins by becoming one with the Earth's soil and then reforming their bodies whole again. The first time Diana does this she prays to her god Gaea saying: "Gaea, I pray to you. Grant me your strength. You are the Earth who suckled me, who nurtured and bred me. Through you all life is renewed. The circle which never ends. I pray you, mother Gaea, take me into your bosom. Please, let me be worthy." During writer John Byrne's time on the comic it was stated that this is a very sacred ritual, to be used only in the most dire of circumstances.

Technology
The Purple Ray is a quasi-mystical healing device used by the Amazons. In the Pre-Crisis continuity, it was invented by Diana herself. It has also been used for other purposes, such as empowering Wonder Girl, and as a weapon.

List of notable Amazons

Major Amazons

Introduced Pre-Crisis
 Atalanta - Queen of the lost Amazon River tribe.
 Dalma - A renegade Amazon who left Paradise Island and battled Wonder Woman
 Fatsis 
 Orana
 Penthesilea - First Queen of the Amazons on Earth-One
 Sofia Constantinas

Introduced Post-Crisis

 Acantha — A senator (first appearance: Wonder Woman #10)
 Aella — A warrior with a particular affinity for hawks; died during the Amazon civil war (first appearance: Wonder Woman #1)
 Callineira - (first appearance: Wonder Woman #121)
 Calyce — A carpenter (first appearance: Wonder Woman Annual #1)
 Clio — A royal scribe (first appearance: Wonder Woman #38)
 Consivia — The chief architect, slain defending Doom's Doorway (first appearance: Wonder Woman Annual #1)
 Cydippe — The aid to Princess Diana (first appearance: Wonder Woman #53)
 Egeria — A lieutenant in the Amazon army and Captain of the Guard; died defending Doom's Doorway (first appearance: Wonder Woman Annual #1)
 Epione — The chief healer (first appearance: Wonder Woman #2)
 Euboea — A warrior and companion to Diana (first appearance: Wonder Woman #10)
 Eudia — She helped Diana unlock the secrets of the Amazons’ reversion to stone (first appearance: Wonder Woman #12)
 Faruka - An eyepatch-wearing Amazon 
 Grace Choi
 Hellene — A senator and historian, a close friend to Diana who opposed the opening of Themyscira's shores to Patriarch's World; she was murdered by the Cheetah during the War of the Gods (first appearance: Wonder Woman #14)
 Hope Taya - Bodyguard to Lex Luthor along with Mercy Graves.
 Hypsipyle — A former queen of Lemnos, mother of Phthia, the martyr of the Lost Tribe of Amazons (first appearance: Wonder Woman Annual #1)
 Iphthime — A sculptor and lover to Anaya of the Lost Tribe of Amazons (first appearance Wonder Woman #27)
 Magala — The court sorceress; she appears as a cavewoman in Greek garb; she is responsible for casting the spell which transferred a portion of Wonder Woman's powers to Artemis, and for the creation of Donna Troy. Magala was possessed by Ariadne, the woman who murdered Queen Antiope, and used Magala to start the Amazon civil war. Magala was killed by Fury. (first appearance: Wonder Woman #124)
 Melia
 Mercy Graves - Bodyguard to Lex Luthor along with Hope Taya.
 Mnemosyne — The chief historian (first appearance: Wonder Woman #10)
 Myrrha — The chambermaid of the Royal Palace; died during the Imperiex War (first appearance: Wonder Woman #53)
 Nione — A priestess. (first appearance: Wonder Woman #38)
 Oeone - A botanist (first appearance: Wonder Woman #27)
 Orithia
 Pallas — A forger of arms and armor, created Diana's Eagle armor: (first appearance: Wonder Woman Secret Files #1)
 Penelope — A high priestess and oracle of Themyscira, former lover of Menalippe (first appearance: Wonder Woman #21)
 Penthiselea — A mighty Amazon captain and the daughter of Phthia and Melanippus, the Amazons martyr; died in battle with Achilles (first appearance: Wonder Woman #33)
 Phthia — Biological daughter of the Amazon queen of Lemnos: Hypsipyle and the Argonaut Jason. Jason abandoned Hypsipyle, Phthia, and her twin brother when they were infants. Phthia was adopted by Queen Antiope when Hypsipyle died, becoming the first Post-Marston non-Themyscirian born Amazon to join the tribe. After Antiope's death, Phthia became queen of Antiope's tribe of Amazons which later became the Amazons of Bana-Mighdall.
 Polycasta 
 Pythia — The silver haired spiritual mother of Julia Kapatelis (first appearance: Wonder Woman Annual #1)
 Tender Mercy - An Amazonian supervillain and partner of Doctor Impossible
 Timandra — The chief architect (first appearance: Wonder Woman #38)
 Trigona — An Amazon athlete (first appearance: Wonder Woman #0)
 Venelia — A warrior and competitor in the second Contest (first appearance: Wonder Woman #91)

Introduced in the New 52
 Aleka - A large, muscular amazon that often picked on Diana when she was younger. She was killed during the battle with the First Born. She bears resemblance to Artemis of the Bana-Mighdall.
 Daphne
 Demi
 Derinoe - An elderly amazon who had at one point been Hippolyta's lover. She lost her youth due to an encounter with one of Hecate's minions. She later allied herself with Hecate to create Donna Troy to turn the Amazons against Wonder Woman. She was killed after trying to stab Diana herself.
 Dessa - A black Amazon and one of Hippolyta's most trusted friends. She bears resemblance to General Philippus.
 Exoristos - An exiled Amazon who joined the Demon Knights.
 Hessia - An Amazon who, like Diana, left Themyscira and sacrificed her immortality. She was responsible for leaking Diana's relationship with Superman to news sources.
 Myrina Black - An Amazon who helped Darkseid to father Grail.

Introduced in DC Rebirth
 Andromeda - A former lover of Nubia's who was reborn as an Amazon in the Well of Souls.
 Areto - An Amazon astrologer and member of the Council of Themyscira.
 Bia - A trans woman who was reborn through the Well of Souls on Themyscira.
 Castalia - An oracle and member of the Council of Themyscira. When Diana and Steve returned to Themyscira, Steve questioned where Castalia was, though the amazons had no idea who he was speaking of. This led to Wonder Woman discovering that she had never returned to Themyscira in the past.
 Delphine
 Karessi
 Kasia - Diana's lover on Themyscira. After Diana left the island and became Wonder Woman, she revealed to Steve Trevor that it was difficult to say goodbye to Kasia.
 Medusa - A longtime enemy of Wonder Woman, Medusa has recently been redeemed by Queen Nubia and invited to stay on Themyscira as an honorary Amazon.
 Raina - A red-haired amazon who often wears a scarf around her hair.
 Sofia - A blonde-haired amazon and friend to Diana. She was one of the finalists in the contest to become Wonder Woman.
 Zina

Other versions

Flashpoint
In the Flashpoint reality, the Amazons are shown to be at war with the Atlanteans led by Emperor Aquaman. Besides Queen Hippolyta and Princess Diana, the known Amazons are Artemis, Penthesileia, and Philippus. Following the death of Queen Hippolyta, Princess Diana and her Amazons have caused havoc in Western Europe during their war with the Atlanteans and have conquered the United Kingdom killing 12 million in the process. The Amazons also have a group of female warriors on their side called the Furies that are loyal to Princess Diana out of fear of her which consisted of Arrowette, Cheetah, Cheshire, Giganta, Hawkgirl, Huntress, Katana, Lady Vic, Silver Swan, Starfire, Terra, and Vixen. In addition, Enchantress is depicted as a spy working for the Amazons.

Injustice: Gods Among Us
Several Amazons appear in the comic series based on the Injustice 2 video game. Among them include Mala, Nubia, Menalippe, Philippus, and Antiope.

In other media

Television
 The Amazons appeared in the 1974 television film Wonder Woman starring Cathy Lee Crosby as Diana. Other Amazons included Queen Hippolyta (Charlene Holt) and Ahnjayla (Anitra Ford).
 The Amazons again appeared in the 1970s live action television series of The New, Original Wonder Woman and "The New Adventures of Wonder Woman", starring Lynda Carter. Among them are the Queen Mother (Cloris Leachman, Carolyn Jones and Beatrice Straight), Diana (Lynda Carter), the Amazon Doctor (Fannie Flagg), Rena, Drusilla (Debra Winger), Magda, Dalma, Asclepia (Bettey Ackerman) and Evadne.
 The Amazons appears in the Challenge of the Super Friends episode "Secret Origins of Super Friends".
 The Amazons appeared in several episodes of Justice League and Justice League Unlimited. They were most prominently featured in the two-part Justice League episode "Fury" where a rogue Amazon named Aresia attempted to unleash a plague that would kill all men on Earth. The Amazons also appeared in the Justice League episodes "Secret Origins" and "Paradise Lost", as well as the Justice League Unlimited episode "The Balance".
 The Amazons briefly appeared in the Batman: The Brave and the Bold episode "Triumvirate of Terror!", where Queen Hippolyta held a tournament on Paradise Island. Joker infiltrated the island by disguising himself as a woman, and won the tournament by using his trademark Joker venom to poison all of the Amazons present in the arena.
 The Amazons appear in the Justice League Action episode "Luthor in Paradise". They attempt to fight off Lex Luthor when Circe assists him in his plot to obtain the Oculus of the Argo that would grant him the powers of Zeus that had been entrusted to Hippolyta by Hera.
 The Amazons appear in the Harley Quinn episodes "Bachelorette" and "The Runaway Bridesmaid".
 The Amazons appear in the DC Super Hero Girls episode "#SweetJustice" (part 3 and 4).
 A television series from DC Studios titled Paradise Lost, centered on the Amazons, will be released on HBO Max.

Film
 The Amazons appear in the animated film Wonder Woman.
 The Amazons appear in the animated film Superman/Batman: Apocalypse.
 The Amazons appear in the animated film Justice League: The Flashpoint Paradox. Like the comics, they are at war with the Atlanteans.
 The Amazons appear in the animated film DC Super Hero Girls: Hero of the Year.
 The Amazons appear in the animated film Wonder Woman: Bloodlines.
 The Amazons appear in the films set in the DC Extended Universe:
 The Amazons appear in Wonder Woman. Their home of Themyscira was created by Zeus in his dying breath to be a sanctuary for the Amazons following Ares' massacre of his fellow gods.
 The Amazons appear in Justice League and its director's cut. It was revealed that the Amazons assisted the tribes of man, the Atlanteans, the Olympian Gods, and the Green Lantern Corps in fighting an invasion (Steppenwolf's in the Justice League film, Darkseid's in the "Snyder Cut" film) of Earth. Many centuries later, Steppenwolf attacks Themyscira to seize the Mother Box guarded by them.
 The Amazons appear in Wonder Woman 1984. There is an artifact called the Armor of Asteria which was worn by the legendary Amazon of the same name who bought her fellow Amazons time to evacuate to Themyscira. Wonder Woman later wore the armor when fighting Cheetah and confronting Maxwell Lord. In a mid-credits scene, it revealed that Asteria (portrayed by Lynda Carter) is still alive among the humans.
 In December 2019, Wonder Woman and Wonder Woman 1984 director Patty Jenkins and star/producer Gal Gadot announced at Comic Con Experience 2019 that they are considering producing a spin-off film focusing on the Amazons.
 The Amazons appear in the Looney Tunes live-action/animation film Space Jam: A New Legacy. Lola Bunny is depicted as having moved with the Amazons from the DCEU.

Miscellaneous
Amazons appear in the Smallville Season 11 digital comic based on the TV series.

Video games
 The Amazons appear in several cutscenes in Mortal Kombat vs. DC Universe, as well as Wonder Woman's in-game ending. In the game's storyline, they are shown defending Paradise Island after Shang Tsung and his Tarkatan warriors invade it.
 The Amazons appeared in DC Universe Online. Besides Wonder Woman, Io, Mala, and Clio are the only known Amazons from the comics that appear in this game. Wonder Woman rallies the Amazons to fight Circe's Beastiamorph army in Metropolis. The foot soldiers of the Amazons consists of Amazon Hoplite Minors, Amazon Hoplite Majors, Amazon Hoplite Spearmaidens, Amazon Archer Minors, Amazon Archer Majors, Amazon Panarchos, an Enchanted Statue.
 The Amazons appear in Wonder Woman's entry and victory poses in Injustice: Gods Among Us. In the story mode, the Justice League's Wonder Woman is brought to Themyscira by the alternate Ares who tells her that her counterpart in the Regime is amassing the Amazons into helping out in High Councillor Superman's plot to cause fear in Metropolis. After defeating the alternate Raven, Wonder Woman defeats her alternate counterpart and persuades the Amazons to help the Insurgency fight against the forces of the Regime. They are convinced and help Wonder Woman in fighting off the Atlantean Army led by the alternate Aquaman. In the aftermath of Superman's victory over High Councillor Superman, Wonder Woman is shown dethroning her alternate counterpart who is then taken away by the Amazon guards.

See also
 Woman warrior
 List of women warriors in folklore

External links
 Amazons of Themyscira - DC Comics Database - a Wikia wiki
 Carol A. Strickland's Amazon Indices - A list of post-Crisis Amazons (work in progress).
 Lorendiac's Lists: Long-Lost Amazon Tribes

References

Characters created by H. G. Peter
Characters created by William Moulton Marston
Comics characters introduced in 1941
DC Comics characters who can move at superhuman speeds
DC Comics characters with superhuman senses
DC Comics characters with superhuman strength
DC Comics female characters
DC Comics LGBT characters
Fictional characters by gendered occupation
Fictional matriarchies
Fictional secret societies
Fictional human races
Fictional warrior races
Human-derived fictional species
Wonder Woman characters